033 or Zero Three Three is a 2010 Bengali film directed by Birsa Dasgupta in a directorial debut and produced by Moxie Entertainments. It stars Rudranil Ghosh and Parambrato Chattopadhyay.

033 is the STD code for Kolkata city, and the story is based on the theme of increasing youth migration outside Kolkata for career opportunities.

Cast 
 Parambrato Chattopadhyay as Som, lead guitarist
 Swastika Mukherjee as Mrinalini, NRI
 Mumtaz Sorcar as Ria, vocalist
 Sabyasachi Chakraborty as Santiago
 Dhruv Mukherjee as Voodoo, drummer
 Rudranil Ghosh as Rudra, keyboardist
 Saheb Chatterjee
 Madhabi Mukherjee

Soundtrack 
The soundtrack's music director is Chandrabindoo (band) and the lyrics are penned by Srijato.

References

External links 
 

2010s Bengali-language films
2010 comedy-drama films
Films set in Kolkata
Indian comedy-drama films
2010 directorial debut films
2010 films
Bengali-language Indian films
Films directed by Birsa Dasgupta